Fausto Cannone (1 March 1938 – 9 January 2017) was an Italian singer-songwriter, teacher and poet.

Biography
Fausto Cannone was born in Alcamo, in the province of Trapani on March 1, 1938; he was the son of Gaspare Cannone (a literary reviewer and an anarchist who emigrated to the U.S.A.); his mother died when he was just a child, so he had an unhappy adolescence. 
He began his artistical career in the '60s by playing as a guitarist and lead singer in some bands in Genoa, where he met Fabrizio De André, Luigi Tenco and other singers.

After returning to Sicily he got a degree in canto at the Conservatorio Alessandro Scarlatti in Palermo, then he studied with maestro Eliodoro Sollima  (harmony and composition). He also taught musical education in grammar schools for several years.
In the late '70s Cannone started to dedicate on popular music and created about 700 works which included ballads, songs and poems inspired by the traditions and people of his homeland. 

As he did not like the music business, he published a few albums only in the last years of his life.

With Ignazio Buttitta and Rosa Balistreri
Thanks to the collaboration with the Sicilian poet Ignazio Buttitta and Rosa Balistreri, Fausto Cannone has discovered his love for his land and for the people who have fought for Sicily. He set to music 16 poems and a comedy for Buttitta who wrote about Cannone: 
Faustu Cannuni sona la chitarra cu li irita e la libertà cu lu cori (translation: Fausto Cannone plays the guitar with fingers and freedom  with the heart.

He travelled with Rosa Balistreri all over Europe; Cannone was her guitar-man for 5 years. He partecipated, with her and Peppino Gagliardi, in the television program entitled Un'ora per voi introduced by Corrado.

In 2008 he published the album Diario d'amore musiche per sognare and received, together with Massimo Ranieri, the prize Pigna d'argento at Teatro Politeama in Palermo.

Civil committment in his works
The fight against violence, in favour of peace and freedom are the values which Cannone transmits through his songs; in 2017 he published the second album called In nome della legalità: a collection of the stories and heritages of men like Paolo Borsellino, Giovanni Falcone, Rocco Chinnici, Dalla Chiesa, Rosario Livatino, Ludovico Corrao, Peppino Impastato, Mauro Rostagno.
The songs in this cd – said Fausto Cannone – are dedicated to all the victims of mafia who devoted their own lives to the values of legality and justice, who will continue to live in the memory of all those peole believing and fighting for a just cause. A cd which is also a teaching for young people and that wants to send a message of legality, respect for rules and to fight against mafia at all levels.  

His songs reveal his pessimism, due to an unhappy childhood, the courage for suffer and fighting, without the acceptance of any compromises, which he inherited from his father, Gaspare.

Fausto Cannone sings about characters of different types: from Padre Pio to Giovanni Falcone, from Madre Teresa di Calcutta to Paolo Borsellino. These songs were often presented in different seminaries on Peace an Legality in various Italian cities.  

He used the Sicilian dialect as the language of communication; he also believed in the survival of folkore inside music because our traditions live with it and we are rooted in it.

Museum of Multiethnic Musical Instruments "Fausto Cannone"
Thanks to Fausto Cannone's donation of more than 200 ethnical instruments (string and wind ones), coming from several contries in the world, which he bought in 30 years of travels, it was founded an important and unique museum in Sicily.

The museum hosts more than 20o instruments coming from Thailand to Tibet, from New Guinea al South America, from Polynesia to China, from Australia to Argentina, from South Africa to several European countries. Most of them are poor instruments, made with parts of plants and animals, but there are also valuable craft products.

He wanted to dedicate the museum to his father's memory, Gaspare Cannone who was a journalist, literary critic, anarchist and antifascist.

Discography

2008: DIARIO D'AMORE MUSICHE PER SOGNARE; it contains the following songs:

 Diario d'amore
 E la terra odorerà di ciclamino
 Tutto scorre
 Elegia notturna
 Abbracciati
 Verso il paradiso
 Tra le navate di una chiesa
 Fuori dal tempo
 Ti racconto l'amore
 Amore negli abissi
 Oltre l'amore
 Rime di un sogno
 Un angelo in preghiera

2017: IN NOME DELLA LEGALITA', with these songs:  

 In nome della legalità
 Anni di piombo
 Giovanni Falcone
 Paolo Borsellino
 Omertà
 Rosario Livatino
 Carlo Alberto Dalla Chiesa
 Ludovico Corrao
 Mauro Rostagno
 Peppino Impastato
 Rocco Chinnici
 Sicilia matri mia
 Inno alla pace 

Before these works he had made some 45rpm records, such as: Pedrito el Drito, Perfida, Addio Matera and "Mi piaceva da morire", winner of a prize in Montecarlo.
He also composed other musical works, some of them in the Sicilian dialect, and poems.

Main concerts
1976 and 1977: Bedford in the United Kingdom 
1982: Australia
1986: Marsala
1987: Stadio La Favorita in Palermo
1988: Palasport of Varese
1989: Benares (India)
1990 and 1991: Cuba, Theatre Garcia Lorca
1992: China, at the Hotel Marco Polo 
1993: Finland
1994: Stati Uniti
1996: Teatro Massimo, Palermo
2000: Empoli

Prizes and acknowledgements

Silver cup, Palasport of Varese (1992)
Oscar Giordano Bruno (2005-2014), Palazzo delle Aquile in Messina
Oscar del Mediterraneo (2006), Teatro Politeama in Palermo
National Prize Nino Martoglio, Syracuse (2006)
National Prize Liolà, VIII edition (2006)
Satiro Bronzeo (2007), Teatro Politeama, Palermo
La Pigna D’Argento (2008),
Premio Cultura Unesco  (2010)
Acknowledgement Donna Fugata (2010)
Gran Galà dello Sport Città di Alcamo (2010)
Acknowledgement by the Rotary Club of Castellammare del Golfo (2011)
Prize for the Worl Day of Poetry (2013)
Diploma honoris causa in Science of Communication, by ISLAS (Ist.Superiore di Lettere Arti e Scienze del Mediterraneo) on 3rd November 2013
Gran Galà del Maestro Riino (2014)
Acknowledgement by Kiwanis (2015)
Premio Festival Songs below the stars (2016)
Prize Kiwanis 2015-2016, given for his credits in the artistic-musicalfield and for the donation of his collection of ethnic-musical instruments
Prize for the Provincial Day of legality (2017), received by the Consulta provinciale degli studenti
Member of the Accademia di Sicilia
Honorary member of the Rotary Club Terre degli Elimi

See also 
Museum of Multiethnic Musical Instruments "Fausto Cannone"
 Alcamo
 Calandra & Calandra
 Rosa Balistreri
 Ignazio Buttitta
 Folclore

References

Sources

Marianna Ingrao: La musica popolare di ieri e di oggi nell'esperienza di Fausto Cannone; Palermo, Università degli Studi, facoltà di Scienze della Comunicazione, anno accademico 2014-2015
Giacomo Romano Davare: Il potere e l'anima p.90, ed.Thule, Palermo, 2014

External Links

1938 births
2017 deaths
Italian pop singers
People from Alcamo
Sicilian-language poets
Italian male guitarists
Italian male  singer-songwriters
20th-century Italian  male singers
20th-century guitarists